In the mathematical field of real analysis, the Steinhaus theorem states that the difference set of a set of positive measure contains an open neighbourhood of zero. It was first proved by Hugo Steinhaus.

Statement

Let A be a Lebesgue-measurable set on the real line such that the Lebesgue measure of A is not zero. Then the difference set

 

contains an  open neighbourhood of the origin.

The general version of the theorem, first proved by André Weil, states that if G is a locally compact group, and A ⊂ G a subset of positive (left) Haar measure, then

 

contains an open neighbourhood of unity.

The theorem can also be extended to nonmeagre sets with the Baire property. The proof of these extensions, sometimes also called Steinhaus theorem, is almost identical to the one below.

Proof
The following simple proof can be found in a collection of problems by late professor H.M. Martirosian from the Yerevan State University, Armenia (Russian).

Now assume that , where . Otherwise . But since , and

,

we would get , which contradicts to the initial property of the set. Hence, since , when , it follows immediately that , what we needed to establish.

Corollary 

See also
Falconer's conjecture

Notes

References
.
 
 

 

Theorems in measure theory
Articles containing proofs
Theorems in real analysis